Fraccionamiento sobre Ruta 74 is a populated area composed of two fragments in the Canelones Department of southern Uruguay.

Geography

Location
They are all parts of the wider metropolitan area of Montevideo.

Coordinates of fragments
 Northwest fragment: 
 Southeast fragment:

Population
In 2011 this area had a population of 1,513.
 
Source: Instituto Nacional de Estadística de Uruguay

References

External links
INE map of Villa Crespo y San Andrés, Toledo, Fracc.Camino del Andaluz y R.84, Joaquín Suárez, Fracc.sobre Ruta 74, Villa San José, Villa San Felipe, Villa Hadita, Seis Hermanos and Villa Porvenir

Populated places in the Canelones Department